Botrynema is a genus of hydrozoans in the family Halicreatidae.

Species
There are two recognized species in the genus Botrynema:

References

 

Halicreatidae
Hydrozoan genera